Thomas Guidotti (September, 1638–1706), an English "doctor of physick" and writer, became one of the 17th century's most prolific physical scientists. He used the analytical techniques of his time to detail and document the properties of the hot mineral springs at Bath, Somerset, and touted the waters of Sadler's Wells.

Early life
Guidott was born to Francis Guidott, in Lymington, Hampshire and attended Dorchester Free School before studying Chemistry, Physics and Medicine at Wadham College, Oxford.

Bath, Somerset
In 1668 Guidott moved to Bath and set up an extensive medical practice there. In 1669 he published his first book on Bath, recording both the history of the city and some case studies of the curative properties of the hot spring mineral waters that rose in the city and which had since Roman times fed a spa complex there.

Bath's healing hot mineral springs
In 1676, Guidott published his famous work about the waters at Bath. This work brought the health-giving properties of Bath's waters to the attention of the aristocracy, among whom the town became a popular health resort.

Works

References

1638 births
1706 deaths
17th-century English medical doctors
18th-century English medical doctors
English physicists